Teddy Vlock (born 14 January 1998) is an Israeli-American equestrian.

2020 Tokyo Olympics
Vlock, one of four riders representing Israel in its Olympic equestrian debut, will be competing as part of the jumping team and as a jumping individual. He will be competing with his horse Amsterdam 27, an 11-year-old Holsteiner gelding. Vlock was eliminated from the jumping team qualifiers event after falling off his horse Amsterdam. Both of them are reportedly unharmed.

Personal life
He is a student at Yale University, where he studies psychology. He is also a real estate agent and the founder of T&R Development, a real estate firm with holdings of more than $50 million. Vlock is the son of Karen Pritzker, who according to Forbes, is one of the five hundred wealthiest people in the world.

Vlock has been riding horses since approximately 2012. He trains with Irish international show jumper Darragh Kenny.  As of July 2022, Vlock has not competed in the sport of showjumping since his elimination at the Tokyo Olympic Games in August 2021.

References

External links
 
 

1998 births
Living people
American male equestrians
Israeli male equestrians
Olympic equestrians of Israel
Equestrians at the 2020 Summer Olympics
American show jumping riders
Israeli show jumping riders